Victoria Claire Harwood is a British-born voice actress based in the United States. She works for anime roles at Geneon Entertainment/New Generation Pictures.

Biography 
Harwood was born in Devon, England in 1961 to an English father and Armenian mother (Takouhi Avakian). She grew up from the age of two in Nicosia, Cyprus, where her mother's family had lived since 1936. She moved to London when she was 18.

Harwood started her career as a dancer before moving into television. She appeared in Auf Wiedersehen, Pet as Bettina in 'The Accused' released in 1983. She trained at RADA and worked in theater in London and Europe before marrying film producer William Butler-Sloss. She moved to Hollywood with her husband and two sons, Arum and Roibhilin and continues to work in voice overs. Her best-known role is that of Sir Integra Fairbrook Wingates Hellsing and in The Last Remnant as Roeas.

Harwood's first book, The Seamstress of Ourfa, published in 2018, is the first in a trilogy beginning in the Ottoman Empire in 1895 and following four generations of women until the present day.

Her husband William died in 2018.

Filmography

Anime
Bayonetta: Bloody Fate - Umbran Elder
DearS - Rubi
Hellsing - Sir Integra Fairbrook Wingates Hellsing
Hellsing Ultimate - Sir Integra Fairbrook Wingates Hellsing
Monster - English Wife (ep. 20)
Paranoia Agent - Housewife B 
Strawberry Eggs - Guidance Counselor
Sid and Nancy - Hermione
Texhnolyze - Eriko "Doc" Kaneda

Video games
The Last Remnant - Roeas
Valkyrie Profile 2: Silmeria - Roussalier

References

External links

Living people
Alumni of RADA
British emigrants to Cyprus
British emigrants to the United States
British television actresses
British video game actresses
British voice actresses
20th-century British actresses
21st-century British actresses
Year of birth missing (living people)